Agumatsa is a mountain range in Ghana which includes the country's highest points, Mount Aduadu, and the nearby Mount Afadja. The popular tourist attraction, Wli waterfalls is within the range. The range also contains a conservation area, the Mount Afadja-Agumatsa Range.

References 

Eastern Guinean forests
Mountain ranges of Ghana
Volta Region